The Critics' Choice Movie Award for Best Cinematography is one of the awards given to people working in the motion picture industry by the Broadcast Film Critics Association at their annual Critics' Choice Movie Awards. It was first presented in 2009.

List of winners and nominees

2000s

2010s

2020s

See also
Academy Award for Best Cinematography
BAFTA Award for Best Cinematography
Independent Spirit Award for Best Cinematography
Satellite Award for Best Cinematography

References

C
Lists of films by award
Awards for best cinematography
Awards established in 2009